Deh Bagh or Deh-e Bagh may refer to:
 Deh Bagh, Borujen, Chaharmahal and Bakhtiari Province
 Deh-e Bagh, Lordegan, Chaharmahal and Bakhtiari Province
 Deh Bagh, Kerman
 Deh Bagh, Kermanshah
 Deh Bagh, Kuzaran, Kermanshah Province
 Deh Bagh, Ravansar, Kermanshah Province
 Deh Bagh, Razavi Khorasan